Ý (ý) is a letter of Old Norse, Old Castillian, Old Astur-Leonese, Icelandic and Faroese alphabets, as well as in Turkmen and in romanisations of Russian. In Czech and Slovak languages it represents a long form of the vowel y and cannot occur in initial position. In Vietnamese it is a y with a high rising tonal diacritic. Originally, the letter Ý was formed from the letter Y and an acute accent.

In Icelandic, Ý is the 29th letter of the alphabet, between Y and Þ. It is read as /i/ (short) or /iː/ (long).

In Turkmen, Ý represents the consonant /j/, as opposed to Y, which represents the vowel sound /ɯ/.

In Kazakh, Ý was suggested as a letter for the voiced labio-velar approximant (as well as the diphthongs /ʊw/ and /ʉw/); the corresponding Cyrillic letter is У. The 2021 revision proposed the letter U, with the letter U with a macron (Ū) for the U sound in Kazakh.
 
In Russian language, Ý is used to romanise Ы́.

Other uses
In Vietnamese, Ý means "Italy". The word is a shortened form of Ý Đại Lợi, which comes from Chinese 意大利 (Yìdàlì in Mandarin, a phonetic rendering of the country's name).

Ý does not exist in Modern Spanish, but the accented letter ý can be found in the proper name Aýna, a village in Spain. Nevertheless, it was used in Early Modern Spanish, and it can be observed by some archaic spellings such as the name Ýñigo for Inigo or by the former spelling ýbamos for "íbamos" in older 16th-18th century Spanish writings.

Character mappings

References

Phonetic transcription symbols
Latin letters with diacritics